Biggest Hits is a compilation album by country singer Johnny Cash released in 1984 on Columbia Records, consisting of previously released recordings.

Track listing
"The Baron"
"The Ballad of Ira Hayes"
"It'll Be Her"
"Flesh and Blood"
"Mobile Bay"
"A Boy Named Sue"
"The L & N Don't Stop Here Anymore"
"Bull Rider"
"Last Time"
"Reverend Mr. Black"

References

1984 compilation albums
Johnny Cash compilation albums
Columbia Records compilation albums